Sir William Smith Duthie (22 May 1892 – 17 December 1980) was a Conservative Party politician in the United Kingdom.  He was Member of Parliament (MP) for Banffshire from 1945 until his retirement at the 1964 general election.

References

External links 
 

1892 births
1980 deaths
Unionist Party (Scotland) MPs
UK MPs 1945–1950
UK MPs 1950–1951
UK MPs 1951–1955
UK MPs 1955–1959
UK MPs 1959–1964